A casualty, as a term in military usage, is a person in military service, combatant or non-combatant, who becomes unavailable for duty due to any of several circumstances, including death, injury, illness, capture or desertion.

In civilian usage, a casualty is a person who is killed, wounded or incapacitated by some event; the term is usually used to describe multiple deaths and injuries due to violent incidents or disasters. It is sometimes misunderstood to mean "fatalities", but non-fatal injuries are also casualties.

Military usage

Any casualty is no longer available for the immediate battle or campaign, the major consideration in combat; the number of casualties is simply the number of members of a unit who are not available for duty. The word has been used in a military context since at least 1513.

 are civilians killed or injured by military personnel or combatants, sometimes instead referred to by the euphemistic expression "collateral damage".

NATO definitions
The military organisation NATO uses the following definitions:

Casualty
In relation to personnel, any person who is lost to his organization by reason of being declared dead, wounded, diseased, detained, captured or missing.

Battle casualty
Any casualty incurred as the direct result of hostile action, sustained in combat or relating thereto, or sustained going to or returning from a combat mission.

Non-battle casualty
A person who is not a battle casualty, but who is lost to his organization by reason of disease or injury, including persons dying from disease or injury, or by reason of being missing where the absence does not appear to be voluntary or due to enemy action or to being interned.

Other definitions
These definitions are popular among military historians.

Irrecoverable casualty
In relation to personnel, any person killed in action, missing in action or who died of wounds or diseases before being evacuated to a medical installation.

Medical casualty

In relation to personnel, any person incapacitated by wounds sustained or diseases contracted in a combat zone, as well as any person admitted to a medical installation for treatment or recuperation for more than a day. There is a distinction between combat medical casualty and non-combat medical casualty. The former refers to a medical casualty that is a direct result of combat action; the latter refers to a medical casualty that is not a direct result of combat action.

Civilian casualties

Civilian casualties refers to civilians that are killed or wounded as a direct result of military action.

Killed in action

A casualty classification generally used to describe any person killed by means of the action of hostile forces.

Missing in action

A casualty classification generally used to describe any person reported missing during combat operations. They may have deserted, or may have been killed, wounded, or taken prisoner.

Wounded in action

A casualty classification generally used to describe any person who has incurred an injury by means of action of hostile forces.

Prisoner of war

A casualty classification generally used to describe any person captured and held in custody by hostile forces.

Civilian usage
The word "casualty" has been used since 1844 in civilian life.

Incidence

Military and civilian fatalities
According to WHO World health report 2004, deaths from intentional injuries (including war, violence, and suicide) were estimated to be 2.8% of all deaths. In the same report, unintentional injury was estimated to be responsible for 6.2% of all deaths.

See also
List of causes of death by rate

References

Further reading 

America's Wars: U.S. Casualties and Veterans . Infoplease.
Online text : War Casualties (1931), by Albert G. Love, Lt. Colonel, Medical Corps, U.S.A.. Medical Field Service School, Carlisle Barracks, Pennsylvania. The Army Medical Bulletin Number 24.
Selected Death Tolls for Wars, Massacres and Atrocities Before the 20th Century .
Statistical Summary: America's Major Wars . U.S. Civil War Center.
The world's worst massacres . By Greg Brecht. Fall, 1987. Whole Earth Review.
Twentieth Century Atlas – Death Tolls         .
Gifford, Brian. "Combat Casualties and Race: What Can We Learn from the 2003–2004 Iraq Conflict?" . Armed Forces & Society, Jan 2005; vol. 31: pp. 201–225.
Kummel, Gerhard and Nina Leonhard"Casualties and Civil-Military Relations: The German Polity between Learning and Indifference." .Armed Forces & Society, Jul 2005; vol. 31: pp. 513–535.
Smith, Hugh. "What Costs Will Democracies Bear? A Review of Popular Theories of Casualty Aversion." . Armed Forces & Society, Jul 2005; vol. 31: pp. 487–512
Van Der Meulen, Jan and Joseph Soeters."Considering Casualties: Risk and Loss during Peacekeeping and Warmaking." . Armed Forces & Society, Jul 2005; vol. 31: pp. 483–486.
Bennett, Stephen Earl and Richard S. Flickinger. "Americans' Knowledge of U.S. Military Deaths in Iraq, April 2004 to April 2008." . Armed Forces & Society, Apr 2009; vol. 35: pp. 587–604.
Varoglu, A. Kadir and Adnan Bicaksiz"Volunteering for Risk: The Culture of the Turkish Armed Forces." . Armed Forces & Society, Jul 2005; vol. 31: pp. 583–598
Ben-Ari, Eyal. "Epilogue: A 'Good' Military Death." . Armed Forces & Society, Jul 2005; vol. 31: pp. 651–664

Military terminology
 
Killings by type